Kennedys Law LLP is an international commercial law firm specialising in insurance, dispute resolution and advisory services.  In 2019/20 it increased total global revenue by 9% to  £238 million (US $301,).  UK turnover increased by 9.7%, and revenue growth was supported by a 7% increase in the number of fee-earners worldwide, taking global headcount to 2,150. It has offices in Argentina, Australia, Belgium, Bermuda, Brazil, Chile, Colombia, Denmark, France, Hong Kong, India, Ireland, Israel, Mexico, New Zealand, Oman, Peru, Singapore, Spain, the United Arab Emirates, the United Kingdom and the United States.

Specialities 
Insurance claims and coverage expertise is deeply ingrained across Kennedys' global network of offices, with advice provided across all lines including:

 Aviation
 Marine and energy
 Property and casualty; including property damage, contractors all risk, employers’, public and product liability
 Medical malpractice
 Motor liability
 Financial lines; including directors' and officers' liability, financial institutions and professional indemnity
 Speciality risks; including cyber, fine art and specie, political risks and life and health.

Kennedys also advise clients on commercial dispute resolution, company and commercial law, corporate recovery, employment, environment, health and safety, fraud and regulatory defence.

History

In 1899, Kennedys Law LLP was founded in London. It was named after partner Charles Kennedy and operated from a single London site until 1988, when a Brentwood office was opened to handle contentious litigation, principally to serve leading insurers based in East Anglia. In 1996 a Belfast office was opened. Since 2000, numerous other new offices have been opened around the globe. In 2008, Kennedys merged with Davies Lavery and acquired offices in Birmingham and Maidstone. In 2013, Kennedys merged with aviation specialist firm Gates and Partners in a move that added 70 employees and a Brussels office to the firm. In 2016 Kennedys merged with Danish firm Advokatfirmaet Erritzøe and acquired an office in Copenhagen. On November 1, 2016 Kennedys merged with boutique marine and shipping law firm Waltons & Morse. On 1 June 2017 Kennedys merged with a US insurance law firm Carroll McNulty & Kull (CMK), increasing their US practice in all their key markets.  On 1 September 2017, Kennedys merged with commercial disputes firm berg, augmenting their global commercial litigation practice.

Between 2017 and 2020, offices were opened in Mexico City, Melbourne, Bangkok, Buenos Aires, Paris, Bermuda, Bristol (UK), San Francisco, Israel and Oman.

In 2019, Suzanne Liversidge was named Kennedys' first global managing partner.  In 2020, Kennedys IQ, a separate technology driven company that combines human and machine intelligence, was launched.

Ranking and recent awards

Chambers UK 2019 have ranked Kennedys as Band 1 in seven practice areas, and listed 44 lawyers as Notable Practitioners.

The Legal 500 UK 2018-19 have ranked Kennedys as a ‘top-tier firm’ in twelve practice areas and 'recommended' in a further 24 practice areas. 20 partners are listed in the “Leading individuals” list, The Legal 500 UK’s guide to outstanding lawyers nationwide.

In 2018 Kennedys were winners of the Best Client Service Innovation (The Lawyer Awards), and Top Employer - Law (AllAboutSchoolLeavers).  Kennedys were highly commended for Business Services Team of the Year (The Lawyer Awards) and the Future of Legal Services Innovation (Legal Week Innovation Awards).

References

Law firms based in London
Foreign law firms with offices in Hong Kong